(born 21 September 1939) is a Japanese swimmer and Olympic medalist. He participated at the 1960 Summer Olympics, winning a silver medal in 4 x 200 metre freestyle relay.

References

1939 births
Living people
Olympic swimmers of Japan
Olympic silver medalists for Japan
Swimmers at the 1960 Summer Olympics
Japanese male freestyle swimmers
Asian Games medalists in swimming
Swimmers at the 1958 Asian Games
Olympic silver medalists in swimming
Asian Games silver medalists for Japan
Medalists at the 1958 Asian Games
Medalists at the 1960 Summer Olympics
20th-century Japanese people